Hemidactylus ulii is a species of gecko. It is endemic to southwestern Yemen.

References

Hemidactylus
Reptiles described in 2013
Reptiles of the Middle East
Endemic fauna of Yemen